The 2017 Women's March was a network of global political rallies that took place in cities around the world on January 21, 2017. These "sister marches" were both formally and organically related to the popularized 2017 Women's March, all of which happened in concert.  The date of this global protest is particularly significant because it was the first day of President Donald J. Trump's term. In addition, the protest was largely in response the positions of the new presidency and the results of the 2016 presidential election. The march was also about promoting women's rights. Other noted causes included, but were not limited to: immigration reform, climate science, and health care reform, countering religious discrimination, violence against women, LGBTQ abuse, addressing racial inequities (e.g. Black Lives Matter), workers' issues, and environmental issues.


United States

Listed below are 588 marches in the U.S. in support of the 2017 Women's March

Worldwide

Notes

References

External links 

 

2017 in American politics
2017 in Asia
2017 in Europe
2017 in North America
2017 in Oceania
2017 in Africa
2017 protests
2017-related lists
Feminism-related lists
Foreign relations of the United States
History of women's rights
Human rights-related lists
Inauguration of Donald Trump
January 2017 events
Lists of places
Protests against Donald Trump
Protest marches
Reactions to the election of Donald Trump
2017 in women's history
Women's marches
Gatherings of women
List of 2017 Women's March locations
Articles containing video clips